(often known just as the "Encyclopédie"), edited by  Denis Diderot and Jean Le Rond d'Alembert, depicting  ("Reason and Philosophy catching the [sun]beams of Truth"), engraved from Cochin's drawing of 1764.

Works
Other famous works include ,  ("Suite of twelve subjects"), Allégories pour l’édition in-4° de l’abrégé chronologique de l’histoire de France du président Hénault. From works by Jean-Michel Moreau he engraved a portrait of Joseph Ignace Guillotin and a portrait entitled  ("Voltaire working in his garden").

References

External links

French engravers
1744 births
1804 deaths